Peter Aumer (born 17 April 1976) is a German politician of the Christian Social Union in Bavaria (CSU) who has served as a member of the Bundestag for Regensburg in the state of Bavaria from 2009 till 2013 and since 2017.

Political career 
Aumer became a member of the Bundestag again in the 2017 German federal election. He is a member of the Committee for Labour and Social Affairs and the Subcommittee on Disarmament, Arms Control and Non-Proliferation.

References

External links 
 
  
 Bundestag biography 

1976 births
Living people
Members of the Bundestag for Bavaria
Members of the Bundestag 2021–2025
Members of the Bundestag 2017–2021
Members of the Bundestag 2009–2013
People from Regensburg
Members of the Bundestag for the Christian Social Union in Bavaria